The Umberto I Shooting Range is a firing range located in the Lazio region west of Rome, Italy. For the 1960 Summer Olympics, it hosted the pistol and rifle shooting, and the shooting part of the modern pentathlon events.

References
1960 Summer Olympics official report. Volume 1. pp. 66–7.
Roma1960.it information on the Umberto I Shooting Range.

Venues of the 1960 Summer Olympics
Olympic modern pentathlon venues
Olympic shooting venues
Shooting ranges in Italy
Sports venues in Italy